Darlo may refer to:

 Darlington, a town in north east England.
 Darlington F.C., an English football club
 Darlinghurst, New South Wales, an inner-city suburb of Sydney, Australia.
 Darlo (band), German alternative, indie, rock band, on Tapete Records